Campomanesia prosthecesepala is a species of plant in the family Myrtaceae.  The plant is endemic to the Atlantic Forest ecoregion in southeastern Brazil, within Minas Gerais state.

References

prosthecesepala
Endemic flora of Brazil
Flora of Minas Gerais
Flora of the Atlantic Forest
Data deficient plants
Near threatened flora of South America
Taxonomy articles created by Polbot